Matthew "Matt" Kennard (born 1983 in London, England) is an English author and journalist. He is head of investigations at the investigative journalism website Declassified UK, which he co-founded with author and historian Mark Curtis. Kennard has previously written for the New Statesman, The Guardian, the Financial Times, openDemocracy and The Intercept. He has also appeared on Novara Media.

In 2006, while a student journalist, Kennard accused then Leeds University lecturer Frank Ellis of racism and was interviewed on the Today programme on BBC Radio 4. During this period, Kennard wrote for Leeds Student. He also broke the story in the UCLA student paper, the Daily Bruin, of attempts by Harvard professor Alan Dershowitz to suppress the publication of Norman Finkelstein's Beyond Chutzpah by the University of California Press.

Kennard is the author of Irregular Army: How the US Military Recruited Neo-Nazis, Gang Members, and Criminals to Fight the War on Terror, published by Verso Books and The Racket: A Rogue Reporter vs. the Masters of the Universe, published by Zed Books. He was previously a fellow, and then Director, at the Centre for Investigative Journalism.

Declassified UK
In 2019, Kennard and Curtis founded Declassified UK, a news website that concentrates on military and foreign policy. Until September 2021, the website was hosted as a sub-site by the South Africa-based online newspaper Daily Maverick.

In June 2020, Kennard published an investigation into a GCHQ schools programme run by the UK National Cyber Security Centre. The investigation was critical of the programme and GCHQ stopped responding to his enquiries. Kennard lodged a request for information under the UK Data Protection Act to see if the GCHQ had decided to stop dealing with him because of his report on the schools programme. Press Gazette said that the emails Kennard obtained appeared to "show he was blacklisted" by the GCHQ press office for writing a "negative long-read". Kennard commented: "I find it outrageous that the country's largest intelligence agency—funded by the British public to the tune of over a billion pounds annually—just stops engaging with a journalist because it believes my stories paint GCHQ's operations in a 'negative' light … It's doubly worrying in this case because the programme I wanted some basic information on involves thousands of children. In a system that calls itself a democracy, we have a right to know what these types of programmes involve".

In August 2020, Declassified UK contacted the UK Ministry of Defence (MoD) for a comment about a British soldier who had protested against the war in Yemen. The MoD provided no information and a press officer for the MoD eventually commented that "We no longer deal with your publication". Declassified UKs lawyers wrote to the MoD to advise it that the MoD's attitude could be a breach of Article 10 of the European Convention on Human Rights and against the Civil Service Code. National Union of Journalists Assistant General Secretary Seamus Dooley supported Declassified UK and said "The NUJ would be extremely concerned at any unilateral ban by a government department on questions from selected news organisations or publications". A Council of Europe media freedom alert was filed over the issue. The MoD apologised and pledged to treat all media outlets, including Declassified UK, "with fairness and impartiality".

Personal life
Kennard's father is artist Peter Kennard, whose work can be found in the Tate Britain. In 2023, to coincide with Matt's book Silent Coup, the art and activist organisation a/political will be collaborating on an installation of Peter's work.

He has called for the abolition of the British monarchy and private schools.

References

External links
 
 Matt Kennard's blog
 Matt Kennard at The Guardian
 Matt Kennard at openDemocracy

1983 births
Living people
British socialists
British republicans
English republicans
English male journalists
English writers
The Guardian people
Financial Times people
Journalists from London
Novara Media
People associated with the University of Leeds